Görkem Sağlam (born 11 April 1998) is a German professional footballer who plays as an attacking midfielder for Süper Lig side Giresunspor.

Career statistics

References

External links

1998 births
Living people
German people of Turkish descent
Sportspeople from Gelsenkirchen
German footballers
Footballers from North Rhine-Westphalia
Association football midfielders
Germany youth international footballers
VfL Bochum players
Willem II (football club) players
Giresunspor footballers
2. Bundesliga players
Eredivisie players
Süper Lig players
German expatriate footballers
German expatriate sportspeople in the Netherlands
Expatriate footballers in the Netherlands
German expatriate sportspeople in Turkey
Expatriate footballers in Turkey